Monochamus tridentatus is a species of beetle in the family Cerambycidae. It was described by Chevrolat in 1833. It is known from Madagascar.

References

tridentatus
Beetles described in 1833